Diploschizia urophora is a species of sedge moth in the genus Diploschizia. It was described by Walsingham in 1914. It is found in Central America.

References

External links
 Diploschizia urophora at Zipcodezoo.com

Glyphipterigidae
Moths described in 1914